Woolscott is a hamlet in Warwickshire, England. It forms part of the civil parish of Grandborough.

External links

Villages in Warwickshire